Chan Hon Goh, C.M. D.Litt (simplified Chinese: 吴振红; traditional Chinese: 吳振紅; born in 1969 in Beijing, China), is a Chinese-born Canadian ballerina. Goh was most notably a principal dancer with The National Ballet of Canada before going on to become a published author, director, teacher, executive producer, and entrepreneur.

Early life 
Chan Hon Goh was born in 1969 Beijing, China to Choo Chiat Goh and Lin Yee Goh. Both of her parents were Principal Dancers with The National Ballet of China and her uncle, Choo San Goh, was an acclaimed American choreographer and Associate Director of the Washington Ballet. In 1976, during the height of political unrest, they left China for Vancouver, British Columbia, where they established the Goh Ballet Academy. In Vancouver, Chan Hon Goh took her first ballet class at age 9. By age 13, Goh was training in Goh Ballet’s Professional Division and went on to perform as part of their Youth Company and at various international competitions. During her time as a student, Goh became the first Canadian to be awarded a prize at The Royal Academy of Dance’s Genée International Ballet Competition and the Prix de Lausanne in Switzerland.

Career

Stage career 
Chan Hon Goh began her professional career with The National Ballet of Canada in 1988. She progressed to Second Soloist in 1990, to First Soloist in 1992 and in 1994, Ms. Goh became the first ever Principal Dancer of Chinese heritage in the company’s history. 

During her stage career, Goh danced lead roles in ballets such as Romeo and Juliet, Swan Lake, The Sleeping Beauty, Onegin and the title roles in Giselle, Madame Butterfly and La Sylphide. Of particular note was her extensive Balanchine repertoire. Goh had multiple roles created for her at The National Ballet of Canada. She was chosen to perform in the company’s premieres of works by contemporary choreographers John Neumeier, Christopher Wheeldon, and Jirí Kylián, among others.

Goh frequently appeared as a Principal Guest Artist with the Suzanne Farrell Ballet (Kennedy Center for Performing Arts) and with major ballet companies in Europe, Australia, North America and Asia. Dancers Goh has partnered with include Vladimir Malakov, Peter Boal and Johan Kolberg.

Over two decades later, on May 31, 2009, Chan Hon Goh danced her farewell performance as Giselle at the Four Seasons Centre for the Performing Arts in Toronto with The National Ballet of Canada.

Career off-stage 
Along with her husband Chun Che (also a former Principal Dancer with The National Ballet of China), in 1996 Goh launched her own shoe brand "Principal by Chan Hon Goh®." The company manufactures pointe shoes and dance slippers. 

Chan Hon Goh is also a published author. In 2002, Goh's autobiography (co-written with Cary Fagan) entitled Beyond the Dance: A Ballerina's Life was released by Random House. The book was a finalist for the Norma Fleck Award for Canadian Children's Non-Fiction and The Rocky Mountain Book Awards. 

In 2010 Chan Hon Goh became the director of the Goh Ballet Academy. In 2019, Chan Hon Goh opened a second studio location in Toronto, Goh Ballet Bayview. For the past 20 years, Goh has been an honorary advisor to the Chinese Cultural Centre of Greater Toronto.

Awards and honours 
Chan Hon Goh’s accomplishments have garnered several awards including the Queen Elizabeth II Diamond Jubilee Medal, the YWCA Women of Distinction Award, the New Pioneers Arts Award and the Best Teacher Award at the World Ballet Competition. In 2019, Goh was appointed as a member to the Order of Canada for her excellence in ballet as a principal dancer, artistic director and cultural ambassador. Goh was recognized as the recipient of an honorary degree from the University of British Columbia for her significant contributions to society.

See also

 National Ballet of Canada
 National Ballet of China

References

External links
 Dance like Everyone is Watching
 Chan Hon Goh

1969 births
Living people
Date of birth missing (living people)
Canadian ballerinas
Chinese emigrants to Canada
National Ballet of Canada dancers
Naturalized citizens of Canada
People from Vancouver
Prix de Lausanne winners
Vancouver Academy of Music alumni
People from Beijing
Chinese ballerinas